Skirlaugh railway station was a railway station that served the village of Skirlaugh in the East Riding of Yorkshire, England. It was on the Hull and Hornsea Railway.

It opened on 28 March 1864, and closed on 6 May 1957.

References

External links

 Skirlaugh station on navigable 1947 O. S. map

Disused railway stations in the East Riding of Yorkshire
Railway stations in Great Britain opened in 1864
Railway stations in Great Britain closed in 1957
Former North Eastern Railway (UK) stations
Hull and Hornsea Railway